The 2012 Open Barletta Trofeo Dimiccoli & Boraccino was a professional tennis tournament played on clay courts. It was the 16th edition of the tournament which was part of the 2012 ATP Challenger Tour. It took place in Barletta, Italy between 2 and 8 April 2012.

Singles main draw entrants

Seeds

 1 Rankings are as of March 19, 2012.

Other entrants
The following players received wildcards into the singles main draw:
  Simone Bolelli
  Enrico Burzi
  Fabio Fognini
  Michal Schmid

The following players received entry from the qualifying draw:
  Denis Bejtulahi
  Filip Krajinović
  Nikola Mektić
  Giammarco Micolani

Champions

Singles

 Aljaž Bedene def.  Potito Starace, 6–2, 6–0

Doubles

 Johan Brunström /  Dick Norman def.  Jonathan Marray /  Igor Zelenay, 6–4, 7–5

External links
Official Website
ITF Search
ATP official site

Open Barletta Trofeo Dimiccoli and Boraccino
Open Città della Disfida